Marvel Comics Super Special was a 41-issue series of one-shot comic-magazines published by Marvel Comics from 1977 to 1986. They were cover-priced $1.50 to $2.50, while regular color comics were priced 30 cents to 60 cents, Beginning with issue #5, the series' title in its postal indicia was shortened to Marvel Super Special. Covers featured the title or a variation, including Marvel Super Special, Marvel Super Special Magazine, and Marvel Weirdworld Super Special in small type, accompanied by large logos of its respective features.

These primarily included film and TV series adaptations, but also original and licensed Marvel characters, and music-related biographies and fictional adventures.

Issue #7 was withdrawn after completion, and never published in English. Issue #8 was published in two editorially identical editions, one magazine-sized, one tabloid-sized.

Publication history
The premiere issue, dated simply 1977, featured the rock band Kiss in a 40-page story written by Steve Gerber, penciled by John Romita Jr., Alan Weiss, John Buscema, Rich Buckler, and Sal Buscema, which saw the quartet battling Marvel supervillains Mephisto and Doctor Doom. The members of the band had samples of their blood mixed into the ink used to print the first issue. Kiss reappeared in an occult adventure in issue #5 (1978). With that issue, the series' title in its postal indicia was shortened to Marvel Super Special.

Marvel's licensed pulp fiction character, Robert E. Howard's Conan the Barbarian, which was concurrently appearing in a long-running color comic book, starred in issues #2 (1977) and #9 (1978), with adaptations of the Arnold Schwarzenegger films Conan the Barbarian and Conan the Destroyer published as issues #21 (1982) and #35 (Dec. 1984), respectively. An adaptation of the film starring Marvel's original spin-off character, Red Sonja, appeared as issue #38 (1985). The other Marvel properties to be featured were the character Star-Lord in #10 (Winter 1979), the feature Weirdworld in #11-13 (Spring - Fall 1979), and Howard the Duck in #41 (Nov. 1986), the final issue.

Issue #3 featured an adaptation of Close Encounters of the Third Kind by writer Archie Goodwin and artists Walt Simonson and Klaus Janson. Simonson described working on the adaptation as "the worst experience of my comics career" due to the lack of visual reference and the inability of Marvel to obtain the likeness rights to the lead actors in the film. Except for a biography of The Beatles in issue #4 (1978), the remainder adapted fantasy, science fiction, and adventure films of the day, including Blade Runner, Dragonslayer, The Adventures of Buckaroo Banzai, and two Star Wars, two Indiana Jones, and two James Bond films, and such other films as Jaws 2 and the children's musical comedy The Muppets Take Manhattan.

The sole TV series adaptation was of Battlestar Galactica in issue #8 (1978), which was published in two editorially identical editions, one magazine-sized, one tabloid-sized. This special was partially redrawn and expanded into three issues when Battlestar Galactica became a monthly comic book series. The adaptations of Star Trek: The Motion Picture (issue #15) and Blade Runner (issue #22) were also reprinted in standard comic book format, the former also as the first few issues of a continuing series.

Each issue included text features and other additional material.

Missing issue

Marvel Super Special #7, an adaptation of the film Sgt. Pepper's Lonely Hearts Club Band, by writer David Anthony Kraft and artists George Pérez and Jim Mooney was promoted on the "Bullpen Bulletins" page in Marvel Comics cover-dated January 1979. It was never published in the U.S. "because the book was late and the movie proved to be a commercial failure", according to a contemporaneous news account, which added, without substantiation, that, "reportedly, Marvel's adaptation was published in Japan". A French translation was published by Arédit-Artima under two covers, one for the French market and one for the French-speaking Canadian market. A Dutch version with yet another different cover was published.

Penciler George Pérez, recalled that Marvel had
 Pérez said Bob Larkin had done the cover art but the actual artist was Tom Palmer.

The issues

Collected editions
 Star-Lord: Guardian of the Galaxy includes Marvel Super Special #10, 424 pages, July 2014, 
 Weirdworld includes Marvel Super Special #11-13, 312 pages, April 2015,

References

External links 
 "The 5 Best (and 5 Worst) Marvel Comics Super Specials" at Topless Robot
 "Marvel Comics Super Special" at The Encyclopedia of Science Fiction

1977 comics debuts
1986 comics endings
Comics anthologies
Comics based on films
Comics by Archie Goodwin (comics)
Comics by David Michelinie
Comics by Dennis O'Neil
Comics by Doug Moench
Comics by George Pérez
Comics by Howard Chaykin
Comics by J. M. DeMatteis
Comics by Louise Simonson
Comics by Marv Wolfman
Comics by Michael Fleisher
Comics by Roy Thomas
Comics by Steve Gerber
Comics by Walt Simonson
Defunct American comics
Marvel Comics titles
Series of one-shot comics